A unibrow (or jacco brow or monobrow; called synophrys in medicine) is a single eyebrow created when the two eyebrows meet in the middle above the bridge of the nose. The hair above the bridge of the nose is of the same color and thickness as the eyebrows, such that they converge to form one uninterrupted line of hair.

History 
The word monobrow first appeared in print in 1968, and the adjectival form monobrowed followed in 1973, in Martin Amis' novel The Rachel Papers. The first known use of the word unibrow was in 1981.

Culture and beauty

Oman 
A unibrow is considered as a sign of beauty by Baluchi Omanis. Its popularity causes women to draw a black line joining the brows as a part of their routine makeup to fake a unibrow. A study found the prevalence of synophrys to be at 11.87% in the Omani population.

Tajikistan 
In Tajikistan, a unibrow is viewed as an attractive quality in both men and women. For women, it is associated with virginity and purity and, in men, virility. If there is no unibrow present, or if it is weak, it is commonplace for women to use a kohl liner or a modern kajal pen to simulate a unibrow.

Elsewhere 

The unibrow has largely been seen as undesirable in the Americas and Europe, with the hairs often plucked, shaved, or waxed away.
The artist Frida Kahlo was famous for her unibrow, which she often depicted in self-portraits. Greek-Cypriot model Sophia Hadjipanteli is also known for her unibrow.

It is also the trademark of NBA player Anthony Davis, football player Marouane Fellaini and YouTuber ElectroBOOM. Famous boxer Roberto Elizondo also famously sported a unibrow during his professional boxing fighting days.

Bert, Herry Monster, and Oscar the Grouch from Sesame Street, Muppets Sam Eagle, Statler and Animal, Tim Lockwood from Cloudy with a Chance of Meatballs, Spanky Ham from Drawn Together, Squilliam Fancyson from SpongeBob SquarePants, Helga Pataki from Hey Arnold!, and Baby Gerald from The Simpsons are fictional characters with a unibrow.

Medicine

Genetics 
The unibrow is a genetic trait. It is associated with the PAX3 gene.

Medical conditions 
A unibrow is part of normal human variation, but can also stem from developmental disorders. A unibrow is a recognized feature of Cornelia De Lange syndrome, a genetic disorder whose main features include moderate to severe learning difficulties, limb abnormalities such as oligodactyly (fewer than normal fingers or toes), and phocomelia (malformed limbs), and facial abnormalities including a long philtrum (the slight depression/line between the nose and mouth).

Other medical conditions associated with a unibrow include:
Waardenburg syndrome;
Patau syndrome;
Smith-Lemli-Opitz syndrome;
Sanfilippo syndrome;
3p deletion syndrome;
 Chromosome Deletion Dillan 4p Syndrome (Wolf–Hirschhorn syndrome);
Gorlin syndrome (Basal Cell Nevus Syndrome);
Cornelia de Lange Syndrome
 Frontometaphyseal dysplasia;
 ATRX syndrome;
 Chromosome 9q34 Microdeletion Syndrome or Kleefstra syndrome.
17q12 microduplication syndrome

See also 
 Glabella

References

External links

Eyebrow